Stephen Goosson (March 24, 1889 - March 25, 1973) was an American film set designer and art director.

Born in Grand Rapids, Michigan, Goosson was an architect in Detroit before starting his film career as art director for producer Lewis J. Selznick, and films for Fox Film Corporation such as New Movietone Follies of 1930. He eventually was hired by Columbia Pictures, where he served as supervising art director for 25 years.

Goosson won the Academy Award for Best Art Direction for Lost Horizon. His designs for the film have been noted as excellent examples of the Streamline Moderne style that reached the height of its popularity that year. Additional credits include Mr. Deeds Goes to Town, Theodora Goes Wild, The Awful Truth, Holiday, Meet John Doe, The Little Foxes, The Jolson Story, and The Lady from Shanghai.

Goosson died of a stroke in Woodland Hills, California.

Selected filmography
 A Blonde for a Night (1928)
 Let 'Er Go Gallegher (1928)
 Just Imagine (1930)
 Shanghaied Love (1931)
 You May Be Next (1936)
 Lost Horizon (1937)
 The Awful Truth (1937)
 Women of Glamour (1937)
 She Married an Artist (1937)
 Murder in Greenwich Village (1937)
 Squadron of Honor (1938)

See also
 Art Directors Guild Hall of Fame

External links

American art directors
Best Art Direction Academy Award winners
Artists from Grand Rapids, Michigan
1889 births
1973 deaths
American production designers